Tapsell Foreland is a broad, mostly snow-covered foreland jutting into the sea between Yule Bay and Smith Inlet, northern Victoria Land. Much of the central portion of this feature rises above 800 m The name Tapsell, applied by New Zealand Antarctic Place-Names Committee (NZ-APC) in 1969, is the surname of the Master of the barque Brisk, one of the whaling vessels based on Enderby Settlement at Port Ross, Auckland Islands, 1849–52. In an exploratory voyage in February 1850, Tapsell sailed south to the Belleny Islands and then west along the parallel of 67S as far as 143E. Despite the high latitude, no land was sighted.

Peninsulas of Antarctica
Landforms of Victoria Land
Pennell Coast